Nobody's Wife (Spanish:La mujer de nadie) is a 1950 Spanish drama film directed by Gonzalo Delgrás and starring Adriana Benetti, José Crespo and José Suarez.

Synopsis 
Javier Tasana adopts the daughter of a painter who has died in misery. Little Ella makes her adoptive father's character change little by little, but when she reaches adolescence, the young Ella will fall in love with her father's favorite disciple.

Cast
 Adriana Benetti as Eliana  
 José Crespo as Javier Tassana  
 José Suárez as Juan Bautista Nebot  
 Antonio Bofarull as Don César  
 Fernando Sancho as Martorell  
 Consuelo de Nieva as Clotilde  
 Modesto Cid as Manolo  
 Camino Garrigó as Vecina del pueblo  
 Liria Izquierdo as Eliana niña  
 Silvia de Soto as Invitada en fiesta  
 Pedro Mascaró as Miembro jurado  
 Enrique Navas as Invitado al principio  
 Emilio Fábregas as Miembro jurado 
 Fernando Porredón as Invitado fiesta  
 Jesús Puche as Pintor criticón 
 Luana Alcañiz as Duquesa  
 José Clará as sculptor  
 Adrián Jaramillo  
 María Lledó 
 Lali Monti
 Víctor Moya as painter

References

Bibliography 
 Àngel Comas. Diccionari de llargmetratges: el cinema a Catalunya durant la Segona República, la Guerra Civil i el franquisme, (1930–1975). Cossetània Edicions, 2005.

External links 
 

1950 films
1950s Spanish-language films
Films directed by Gonzalo Delgrás
Spanish drama films
1950 drama films
Spanish black-and-white films
1950s Spanish films